Mímir is a primal figure of Norse mythology.

Mimir may also refer to:

 Mimir (band)
 Mimir (Planescape), a magical construct in the Dungeons & Dragons Planescape setting
 an alternate name of Regin in Norse mythology
 a character in the 2018 video game God of War